Jhangi Hamid is a town in the Islamabad Capital Territory of Pakistan. It is located at 33° 16' 35N 73° 15' 10E with an altitude of 499 metres (1640 feet).

References 

Union councils of Islamabad Capital Territory